Securitize, Inc is a financial technology company that provides businesses a platform to raise capital from institutional, accredited or retail investors (crowdfunding) with shares issued in the form of digital tokens recorded on the blockchain, including for Oddity (the parent of online beauty brand Il Makiage) and digital custodian Exodus, which used the Securitize platform to raise $75 million in 2021. Securitize also operates a broker-dealer marketplace on which tokenized shares in private companies are traded. Securitize has approximately 3,000 clients with a combined 1.2 million investors and is regulated by both the U.S. Securities and Exchange Commission and FINRA. In June 2022, Securitize became authorized by the Spanish government to enter its securities test environment.

Funding 
Securitize has raised approximately $100 million in funding. Its most recent funding round was a $48 million Series B in June 2021, led by Morgan Stanley and Blockchain Capital, in what Forbes described as "Morgan Stanley’s first dedicated investment in the crypto space."

History 

 November 2017: Securitize founded by Carlos Domingo and Jamie Finn
 August 2019: Securitize becomes first SEC-registered digital transfer agent
 September 2019: Securitize completes $12 million Series A investment round
 November 2020: Securitize acquires a broker-dealer license and automated trading system registration through the acquisition of Distributed Technology Markets
 March 2021: Securitize facilitates Sumitomo Mitsui Trust Bank's issuance of the first credit-rated, asset-backed security token fund in Japan
 May 2021: Securitize platform used to facilitate $75 million crowdfunded capital raise
 June 2021: Securitize completes $48 million Series B investment round
August 2021: Securitize facilitates the first television show to tokenize its net profits, "Hold On for Dear Life," produced and directed by Entourage's Rob Weiss
September 2021: Securitize launches marketplace for trading digital asset securities
October 2021: Securitize hires former SEC Division of Trading & Markets Director Brett Redfearn and announces Advisory Board including former Twitter CEO Dick Costolo
December 2021: Securitize launches first tokenized funds tracking Standard & Poors indices
February 2022: Securitize acquires Pacific Stock Transfer
May 2022: Securitize confirms it will only offer stablecoins backed by U.S. dollars such as USDC

References 

Financial technology companies
Technology companies established in 2017
American companies established in 2017